Grayson Russell (born May 1, 1998) is an American actor. He is best known for his roles in Talladega Nights: The Ballad of Ricky Bobby and the Diary of a Wimpy Kid film series.

Life and career
Russell was born on May 1, 1998 in Clanton, Alabama, the son of Crystal and Jerry Russell, who have a Christian music ministry. He attended public high school in Clanton at Chilton County High School, home of the Tigers, and graduated from there in 2016.

He later attended Lee University in Cleveland, Tennessee, for a brief time.

His acting career began at the age of six, when he appeared as Cowboy Grayson, in a series of television commercials for a local car dealership.  Other commercials include appearances in a regional McDonald’s spot, and a Blue Cross Blue Shield of Tennessee commercial. Russell’s film career began with an open casting call for a role in Talladega Nights: The Ballad of Ricky Bobby.

His mother, Crystal Russell, has stated that Grayson auditioned to gain some experience with the process, and the family was surprised to learn that he would be playing Texas Ranger Bobby, the son of racecar driver Ricky Bobby (played by Will Ferrell).

The Rainbow Tribe, Russell’s second movie was based on a true story, and was filmed in California in 2007. The independent film won Best Picture at the 2008 The Feel Good Film Festival founded by Kristen Ridgway Flores in Los Angeles, but was released direct-to-video in 2011.

In 2009, Russell appeared in a single episode of Disney's sitcom I’m in the Band. In 2010, Russell appeared in the film adaptation of author Jeff Kinney's Diary of a Wimpy Kid. Russell played Fregley, an awkward and unpopular classmate of Greg Heffley.  He reprised the role in the sequels, Diary of a Wimpy Kid: Rodrick Rules (2011) and Diary of a Wimpy Kid: Dog Days (2012).

In 2011, Russell also appeared in the Alien Candy episode of R.L. Stine's The Haunting Hour. Russell plays an autistic baseball savant named Rafer, in the 2013 feature film Season of Miracles, a role for which fans and critics have acknowledged his broader acting range.

In 2020, Grayson played a signalman in the Apple TV+ movie Greyhound starring Tom Hanks.

Filmography

Film appearances

Film voice

Television appearances

References

External links
 

1998 births
Living people
21st-century American male actors
American male child actors
American male film actors
American male television actors
Male actors from Alabama
People from Clanton, Alabama